Partido de la Gente (Spanish for "Party of the Folk" or "Party of the People") is a Uruguayan political party.

History
Founded in 2016, its main leader is Edgardo Novick.

Three members of the party have been elected to the legislature: the Senator Daniel Bianchi and the Representative Guillermo Facello, both former Colorados; and the Representative Daniel Peña, a former Blanco. However, in early 2019 Bianchi was expelled from the party after driving under the influence of alcohol.

Name
Gente is a Spanish-language word for "people" or "populace". There is also another synonym, pueblo. Locally, the word pueblo may have a left-leaning or revolutionary connotation, as used by other political groups such as Partido por el Gobierno del Pueblo and Partido por la Victoria del Pueblo. As such, the name of the party  used a more neutral term without the connotation, while still maintaining a similar translation as the "Party of the Folk", or "Party of the Plain Folks", as well as "Party of the People".

Electoral history

Presidential elections

Chamber of Deputies and Senate elections

References

External links

2016 establishments in Uruguay
Conservative liberal parties
Conservative parties in Uruguay
Neoliberal parties
Political parties established in 2016
Political parties in Uruguay
Right-wing populist parties